The Ministry of Finance and Economy of Turkmenistan (Türkmenistanyň Maliýe we Ykdysadyýet Ministirligi) is the central government institution charged with leading the financial policy of Turkmenistan. It was established in 1991, and reformed in 2008. In 2017, it was merged again with the ministry of economy. The current Minister of Finance and Economy is Muhammetgeldi Serdarov.

Ministers of Finance and Economy 
, May 1992 - July 1993
Muhammad Abalakov, July 1993 - April 1995
, April 1995 - August 1996
Matkarim Rajapov, August 1996 - September 2000
Orazmurad Bekmuradov, September 2000 - November 2001
Enejan Ataýewa, November 2001 - November 2002
Yazkuli Kakaliev, November 2002 - April 2004
Bibitach Vekilova, April 2004 - March 2005
Jumaniyaz Annaorazov, March 2005 -  May 2005
Amandurdi Muradkuliev, May 2005 - September 2005
Atamurad Berdiýew, December 2005 - September 2006
Khodjamyrat Geldimyradov, February 2007 - April 2008
, April 2008 - July 2011
, July 2011 - July 2014
, July 2014 - July 2017
, July 2017 - October 2017
, October 2017 - February 2020
Ezizgeldi Annamuhammedov, February 2020 - July 2020
Muhammetgeldi Serdarov, July 2020 -

See also
Economy of Turkmenistan

References

Finance, Ministry of
Economy of Turkmenistan
Turkmenistan
Ashgabat